Gross is an unincorporated community in Lincoln Township, Crawford County, Kansas, United States.

History
Gross was a station and shipping point on the St. Louis & San Francisco Railroad.

The post office in the community was established on 28 September 1907 and discontinued on 30 April 1934.

Gross was the location of Crawford county school #135 and the A.B. Ryder Mercantile Company.

References

Further reading

External links
 Crawford County maps: Current, Historic, KDOT

Unincorporated communities in Crawford County, Kansas
Unincorporated communities in Kansas